Nquthu is a town in Umzinyathi District Municipality in the KwaZulu-Natal province of South Africa.

Village 24 km west-south-west of Barklieside and 53 km east of Dundee, KwaZulu-Natal. Of Zulu origin, the name is derived from isquthu, ‘flat-topped vessel’, descriptive of a nearby hill from which the village takes its name.

Education
Primary
Ntanyandlovu Primary School
Isibuko Sabasha Primary School
Mafitleng Primary School
Dalala Primary School
Monte Casino Primary
Ngwebini Primary School
Qediphika Primary School
Secondary      
 Ubongumenzi Secondary School
 Maceba secondary school
 Sihayo High School 
 Mgazi High School
 Ekucabangeni Secondary School
Nhlalakahle Secondary school
Zicole Senior Secondary school
Gadeleni Secondary School
Phakathwayo Secondary School
Zindlalele Secondary School
Combined School
Life Changing & Christian School

Higher institutions of learning
Mthashana TVET college

References

Populated places in the Nqutu Local Municipality